

Aristophanes of Byzantium (BC) was a Hellenistic Greek scholar, critic and grammarian, particularly renowned for his work in Homeric scholarship, but also for work on other classical authors such as Pindar and Hesiod. Born in Byzantium about 257 BC, he soon moved to Alexandria and studied under Zenodotus, Callimachus, and Dionysius Iambus. He succeeded Eratosthenes as head librarian of the Library of Alexandria at the age of sixty.

Work 
Aristophanes was the first to deny that the "Precepts of Chiron" was the work of Hesiod.

Inventions

Accent system 
Aristophanes is credited with the invention of the accent system used in Greek to designate pronunciation, as the tonal, pitched system of archaic and Classical Greek was giving way (or had given way) to the stress-based system of Koine. This was also a period when Greek, in the wake of Alexander's conquests, was beginning to act as a lingua franca for the Eastern Mediterranean (replacing various Semitic languages). The accents were designed to assist in the pronunciation of Greek in older literary works.

Punctuation 
For a short passage (a komma), a stigmḕ mésē dot was placed mid-level (·). This is the origin of the modern comma punctuation mark, and its name. For a longer passage (a kolon), a hypostigmḗ dot was placed level with the bottom of the text (.), similar to a modern colon or semicolon, and for very long pauses (periodos), a stigmḕ teleía point near the top of the line of text (·). He 

Lexicography 
As a lexicographer he compiled collections of archaic and unusual words. He died in Alexandria around 185–180 BC. His students included Callistratus, Aristarchus of Samothrace, and perhaps Agallis.

Surviving works 
All that has survived of Aristophanes of Byzantium's voluminous writings are a few fragments preserved through quotation in the literary commentaries, or scholia, of later writers, several argumenta to works of Greek drama, and part of a glossary. The most recent edition of the extant fragments was edited by William J. Slater.

See also 
 Homeric scholarship
 Lille Stesichorus
 Polytonic orthography

Citations

General sources

External links 
 "Library of Alexandria"—Catholic Encyclopedia article

180s BC deaths
250s BC births
2nd-century BC Greek people
3rd-century BC Greek people
Ancient Byzantines
Ancient Greek grammarians
Ancient Greek lexicographers
Librarians of Alexandria
Homeric scholars